Mel was a comune (municipality) in the province of Belluno in the Italian region of Veneto, located about  north of Venice and about  southwest of Belluno and about  northeast of Feltre. It merged with the municipalities of Trichiana and Lentiai on 30 January 2019 to form the comune of Borgo Valbelluna.

Overview 
The territory of Mel is home to the medieval Zumelle Castle. The present configuration of the castle dates back to 1311, although the site was in use as a military fortification since the Roman era. Other sights include the Palazzo Zorzi (16th century, now the Town Hall) and the Palazzo delle Contesse (17th century), which houses an archaeological museum with remains from a Veneti Iron Age necropolis found outside the town.

The town is home to several cultural activities: they include art exhibitions in Palazzo delle Contesse  and the choral music festival in July in the Guarnieri palace park.

References

External links 

Cities and towns in Veneto